Janosch Suelzer (born 14 June 1996) is a German male canoeist who won four medals at senior level at the Wildwater Canoeing World Championships.

Medals at the World Championships
Senior

References

External links
 

1996 births
Living people
German male canoeists
Place of birth missing (living people)